The 1932 West Tennessee State Teachers football team was an American football team that represented West Tennessee State Teachers College (now known as the University of Memphis) as a member of the Mississippi Valley Conference during the 1932 college football season. In their ninth season under head coach Zach Curlin, West Tennessee State Teachers compiled a 4–5 record.

Schedule

References

West Tennessee State Teachers
Memphis Tigers football seasons
West Tennessee State Teachers football